Andrzej Koper (born 9 May 1953) - Polish rally driver and four-times champion of his country in 1982, 1984–1985 and 1988.

He is the first Pole who finished the Dakar Rally. During his career he was associated with Renault. He started in European Rally Championship. Now he drives Subaru Impreza N14 in Polish Rally Championship.

References

1953 births
Living people
Polish rally drivers
Place of birth missing (living people)